The Optare MetroDecker is an integral twin-axle double-decker bus produced by British bus manufacturer Optare since 2014. The bus bears resemblance to the Optare MetroCity, sharing similar interior and exterior features. The MetroDecker was designed as the successor to the Optare Olympus and Scania OmniDekka double-deckers, which were both discontinued in 2011, however unlike these, the MetroDecker is only available in integral form.

Optare initially aimed to have MetroDeckers in service in London by the end of 2014 and sales of over 100 MetroDeckers within eighteen months of launch; this did not occur, with no orders placed until June 2018.

Variants

MetroDecker
The Optare MetroDecker was launched in 2014 initially with the 4 cylinder Euro VI Mercedes-Benz OM934LA engine with a 6-speed ZF EcoLife transmission fitted. The bus is built on an integral Optare chassis, making the bus lighter than its body-on-chassis predecessors.

In June 2018, Reading Buses placed the first order for five diesel MetroDeckers with high specification interiors for use on Green Line route 702, following a period of demonstration. Due to the economic impact of the COVID-19 pandemic, Reading Buses cancelled the order in July 2020.

Three pre-production demonstrators were built by Optare for bus operators to trial around the United Kingdom. Two of these entered service with First South Yorkshire, Go North East and the NAT Group, and a demonstrator built to Transport for London specification commenced trials with Go-Ahead London in August 2016. None of these demonstration periods resulted in orders for the diesel MetroDecker.

MetroDecker EV

The Optare MetroDecker EV battery electric bus was launched in late 2015, complementing Optare's single decker range that already have battery electric variants.

The first MetroDecker order for a Transport for London operator came in 2019 when 31 MetroDecker EVs were delivered to Metroline for operation on route 134. 37 MetroDecker EVs were later delivered to Tower Transit in November 2020 for operation on routes 23 and C3, and Go-Ahead London ordered 17 Metrodecker EVs for delivery in May 2021 for operation on route 200.

In March 2019, First York ordered 21 MetroDecker EVs for the city's rebranded York Park & Ride operations. The first of these buses entered service from July 2020.

A hybrid-electric variant was announced during the initial launch of the MetroDecker in 2015, however no orders materialised.

A major fire in May 2022 that destroyed six buses at Metroline's Potters Bar garage, two of which were MetroDecker EVs, caused Switch Mobility to order all MetroDecker EVs to be taken out of service for safety precautions.

MetroDecker H2
The Optare MetroDecker H2 fuel cell bus was announced by Optare in partnership with Arcola Energy in April 2020. Optare aims to establish an export market aimed at countries within a humid subtropical climate requiring use of air conditioning for the MetroDecker H2, however orders are yet to be placed by potential operators.

See also 

 List of buses

Competitors:

 Alexander Dennis Enviro400 MMC
 Alexander Dennis Enviro500 MMC
 Wright StreetDeck

References

External links

Double-decker buses
Low-floor buses
MetroDecker
Vehicles introduced in 2014